Beal v. Doe, 432 U.S. 438 (1977), was a United States Supreme Court case that concerned the disbursement of federal funds in Pennsylvania. Pennsylvania statute restricted federal funding to abortion clinics. The Supreme Court ruled states are not required to treat abortion in the same manner as potential motherhood. The opinion of the Court left the central holding of the Roe v. Wade decisionabortion as a rightintact. The statute was upheld, with Justice Powell writing the majority opinion.

Background
After the Supreme Courts decision in Roe v. Wade those still opposed to abortion in the United States "turned to local legislators in an effort to curb the practice of abortion." This particular abortion case that came before the Supreme Court involved a Pennsylvania law that restricted "Medicaid-funded abortions" only to "indigent women" when deemed medically necessary.

Decision of the Supreme Court
In a 6–3 decision, Justice Powell wrote the decision for the majority. Justices Burger, Stewart, White, Rehnquist and Stevens joined Powell's opinion. The opinion did not disregard Roe; instead, Beal reaffirmed abortion as a right. The majority opinion asserts the constitutionally protected right of abortion does not mean that states have to treat potential motherhood and abortion in the same manner. Furthermore, the opinion allowed restriction of federal funding in first trimester of abortion. Powell continued by stating the law does not create poverty that hinders poor women from seeking abortion. In addition, Powell defends states preference in birth over abortion by claiming Roe does not bar preference.

See also
List of United States Supreme Court cases, volume 432

References

Further reading

External links
 

United States Supreme Court cases
United States Supreme Court cases of the Burger Court
United States abortion case law
1977 in United States case law
History of women in Pennsylvania